The men's 4 x 400 metres relay at the 1974 European Athletics Championships was held in Rome, Italy, at Stadio Olimpico on 7 and 8 September 1974. The third-placed Finnish team was initially disqualified over Markku Kukkoaho's use of his elbows at the start of the anchor leg, but Finland launched a successful counter-protest and kept the bronze medals.

Medalists

Results

Final
8 September

Heats
7 September

Heat 1

Heat 2

Participation
According to an unofficial count, 45 athletes from 11 countries participated in the event.

 (4)
 (4)
 (4)
 (4)
 (4)
 (4)
 (4)
 (4)
 (4)
 (5)
 (4)

References

4 x 400 metres relay
4 x 400 metres relay at the European Athletics Championships